The 1940–41 Buffalo Bulls men's basketball team represented the University of Buffalo during the 1940–41 NCAA college men's basketball season. The head coach was Art Powell, coaching his twenty-fifth season with the Bulls.

Schedule

|-

References

Buffalo Bulls men's basketball seasons
Buffalo
Buffalo Bulls
Buffalo Bulls